Mara Zampieri (born 30 January 1951 in Padua) is an Italian operatic soprano. She trained at Padua Conservatory.

Zampieri has performed in the opera houses of Europe, including Milan, London, Berlin, Munich, Paris, Zurich, Madrid, Barcelona, Lisbon and Vienna; also in San Francisco, New York, Buenos Aires, and Tokyo. She has performed in more than fifty operatic roles, including twenty-one in operas by Verdi.

She favors Italian but she also famously performed in the title role of Richard Strauss's Salome.

She can be seen on video as Lady Macbeth opposite Renato Bruson, and as Minnie in La fanciulla del West.

References

Sources
Hoffman, Sarah, "Mara Zampieri: A Tribute to Verdi", Opera Today, 10 May 2005
Kennedy, Michael and Bourne, Joyce (eds.), "Mara Zampieri", The Concise Oxford Dictionary of Music, Oxford University Press, 2007. (republished on Answers.com).
Warrack, John Hamilton and West, Ewan, "Zampieri, Mara", The Concise Oxford Dictionary of Opera, Oxford University Press, 1996.

External links

Italian operatic sopranos
Musicians from Padua
1951 births
Living people
Österreichischer Kammersänger
20th-century Italian women opera singers
21st-century Italian women opera singers